Persea caerulea is an evergreen tree in the laurel family (Lauraceae). It is native to North and South America.

References

caerulea
Trees of Peru
Trees of Colombia
Trees of Ecuador
Trees of Costa Rica
Trees of Panama
Trees of Bolivia
Trees of Venezuela
Trees of Nicaragua
Trees of Honduras